Hugo Nelson Berly Silva (December 31, 1941 – December 24, 2009) was a Chilean footballer who played as a right-back for Unión Española, Audax Italiano and Santiago Wanderers of Chile and in the Chile national team in the FIFA World Cup England 1966. Berly made ten appearances for Chile, his debut was a 1–0 friendly victory against Argentina on 15 August 1967.

Personal life
Berly had a wife and two daughters. He died aged 67 on December 24, 2009 in Washington, D.C., United States.

Honours
Unión Española
 Chilean Primera División 1973, 1975, 1977

References

External links
 Profile at Solofutbol.cl Profile at

1941 births
2009 deaths
Chilean footballers
Association football fullbacks
Chile international footballers
Audax Italiano footballers
Unión Española footballers
Santiago Wanderers footballers
Chilean Primera División players
1966 FIFA World Cup players
Audax Italiano managers